The mini heart gesture is a trend that was popularized in South Korea in which the index finger and thumb come together like a snap to form a tiny heart.

Popular usage

Before the appearance of finger hearts, it was common to make small hearts with two hands or to make large hearts by raising and curving both arms above the head. Conventionally, heart gestures using both hands and arms have been performed worldwide, but finger hearts are also called Korean Finger Hearts because of its association with the rise of South Korean pop culture.

In South Korea, it is a known symbol among Korean celebrities (namely actors and singers) and their fans, and is popularly performed using the thumb and index finger.

Though various instances of finger hearts may be found from before 2010 (namely, in K-pop musician G-Dragon's childhood photo), finger hearts are considered to have been first popularized by actress Kim Hye-soo then in the K-pop community by Infinite's Nam Woohyun in 2011.

The thumb and index finger gesture has become popular across Asia due to the popularity of K-pop and Korean dramas, and increasingly so in other parts of the world as a factor of the Korean Wave. Most notably the king of K-pop G-Dragon and other band's like PSY, EXO , BTS have popularized the gesture to a wider international audience.

During the 2018 Winter Olympics in Pyeongchang, The North Face provided gloves with highlighted thumb and index finger sleeves to highlight this symbol.

In 2021, the finger heart was added to Unicode 14.0 and Emoji 14.0 with the codepoint U+1FAF0 🫰 as "Hand with Index Finger and Thumb Crossed".

See also
Hand heart
Heart in hand

References 

Hand gestures
Heart symbols